Legal & General Group plc, commonly known as Legal & General, is a British multinational financial services and asset management company headquartered in London, England. Its products and services include investment management, lifetime mortgages (a form of equity release), pensions, annuities, and life assurance.  As of January 2020, it no longer provides general insurance following the sale of Legal & General Insurance to Allianz. It has operations in the United Kingdom and United States, with investment management businesses in the Gulf, Europe and Asia.

Legal & General is listed on the London Stock Exchange and is a constituent of the FTSE 100 Index. Legal & General Investment Management (LGIM), the asset management arm of L&G, is the 10th largest investment management firm in the world by AUM. It is also the second largest institutional investment management firm in Europe (after BlackRock).

History

1836 to 2000
Legal & General was formed by Sergeant John Adams and five other lawyers in June 1836 in a Chancery Lane coffee shop. Originally called the New Law Life Assurance Society, the society was restricted to those in the legal profession. The name was changed to Legal & General Life Assurance Society to reflect that policies were available to the general public but with share ownership restricted to those in the legal profession. The group expanded in the UK and soon began to acquire overseas life assurance companies, purchasing a pensions business from the Metropolitan Life Assurance Company of New York in the 1930s.

The society became a wholly owned division of Legal & General Group plc in the 1970s. Legal & General Group, formed Legal & General America as a holding company in 1981, and bought Government Employees Life Insurance Company (GELICO) and its NY affiliate. The GELICO name changed to Banner in 1983. William Penn was purchased by Legal & General Group Plc as a wholly owned subsidiary of Banner Life Insurance Company in 1989. It bought the Dutch branch of Unlike Assurance Group and also set up business in France during the 1980s.

Following the trend in the United Kingdom at the time of financial institutions entering the estate agency sector, Legal & General purchased Whitegates Estate Agency from Provident Financial Group plc for £19 million in December 1989.

In the 1940s the main office of Legal & General was moved from Temple Bar House in the City of London to a remodelled former girls' school in leafy Kingswood, Surrey, save for some top management functions which remained in London. The girls' school (St. Monica's), which formed the basis for the site, was attended by the novelist Vera Brittain, mother of the politician Shirley Williams. The Kingswood site, which included sports fields, a park, a large and luxurious swimming pool, a canteen and a simulacrum of an English pub, among other facilities, was expanded in the 1950s and again in the 1980s. In 2015, it was announced that the headquarters would close "potentially before 2025". In fact, after a period of uncertainty for the staff at Kingswood, it was announced that the site would shut much earlier, in 2018.

The previous Legal & General logo incorporates the image of the Temple Bar (which is still used in the logo of the company's social and athletic committee), and the founding date. The umbrella logo used today was introduced by former Chief Press Officer Gordon Macdonald in June 1984. Between 1991 and 1994, Legal and General sponsored the Regional Weather Forecasts for the ITV network and in 1999, Legal & General announced plans, which never came to fruition, to merge its business with National Westminster Bank to form the first 'bancassurance' company in the UK.

2000 to present
The company sold the Legal & General Bank and Legal & General Mortgage Services to Northern Rock in 2003 and sold its stake in Gresham Insurance, its joint venture with Barclays Bank, to Barclays in 2005.

In 2008 Legal & General bought Suffolk Life, a provider of Self Invested Pension products, sold Suffolk Life in 2016 and also outsourced its IT development areas to TCS (Tata Consultancy Services). The company formed a joint venture with two Indian public sector banks, Bank of Baroda and Andhra Bank to launch IndiaFirst Life Insurance Company in India in 2009 and outsourced some IT areas to IBM in October 2010. In 2013 the company bought Lucida Life, a pensions buyout company, for £151 million.

In 2014, there was a "shock" announcement that Legal & General was leaving as one of the Association of British Insurers (ABI)'s around 300 corporate members, due to ABI's "decision to transfer its investment business to the Investment Management Association." In the same year, the group disposed of its estate agency business, Xperience, which comprised 89 offices and 75 franchisees, trading as CJ Hole, Ellis and Co, Parkers and Whitegates, to Martin & Co for £6 million.

In 2014, the company formed Legal & General Reinsurance, a Bermudian-based reinsurance company. Legal & General Re completed its maiden external transaction in the Dutch market in cooperation with ASR in December 2015. In May 2016 Legal & General Assurance in the UK bought the £3 billion UK annuity portfolio of Aegon.

In 2019 following earlier speculation, the company agreed the sale of its General Insurance division, Legal & General Insurance, to Allianz Insurance, the latter making a simultaneous purchase of the remaining 51% share of Liverpool Victoria General Insurance (LV=) of which it already owned 49%. The acquisition took effect on 1 January 2020, at which time Legal & General Insurance’s holding company was renamed Fairmead Insurance. The existing policies will be merged into Allianz Insurance's subsidiary LV= under one expanded business. Legal & General's Birmingham office became an LV= site.

Also in 2019, the company acquired a 13% investment in the electric vehicle charging point operator, Pod Point.

Operations
The company offers a wide range of products and, in addition to its direct sales service and brokerage agreements with numerous tied agents and independent financial advisers. It also owns Cala Homes. Legal & General supports institutional pensions, has a large investment arm (Legal & General Investment Management) and holds significant investments in socially responsible businesses from green energy to science parks and affordable housing.

Senior management
In the 1970s and early 1980s, Ron Peet (1925–2020), a socially-conscious actuary, was CEO of Legal & General, having previously headed its Australian operation. Peet helped the campaign for Thalidomide children, Legal & General then owning a large bloc of shares (3.5 million) in Scottish drinks and pharmaceutical company Distillers.

Sir David John Prosser (1944–2020), a Welsh businessman, was the CEO from 1991 to 2005 and is credited with overseeing a period of significant growth in the business. He was followed by Tim Breedon, who became CEO in January 2006. After that Sir Nigel Wilson (the previous CFO) became Group Chief Executive on 30 June 2012.

Arms

References

External links

 Legal & General Group Plc – official company page

Financial services companies established in 1836
British companies established in 1836
Insurance companies of the United Kingdom
Companies listed on the London Stock Exchange
Financial services companies based in the City of London
Life insurance companies of the United Kingdom
1836 establishments in England
British brands